St. Michael's Church in Sharjah, United Arab Emirates, is a Roman Catholic church in the Yarmook area of Sharjah, founded in 1971.  the church is headed by Fr. Savari Muthu .

History
The first St. Michael's Church was founded by Fr. Barnabas in 1971 and was originally just a small chapel close to the British Airforce base. In 1973 Fr. Barnabas shifted it into the  British officers’ mess. The kitchen of the church was converted into the Parish House.

Father Barnabas was succeeded by Fathers Attilio, Edmund, Antonino, Felicio, Godwin and Angelo. The congregation increased along with the space to accommodate all of the parishioners.

The new Church was built by Fr. Angelo Fiumicelli and his team, under the supervision of Bishop Bernard Gremoli. It was consecrated on 2 October 1997 by Cardinal Artinze from the Vatican, with Fr. Angelo as the first parish priest.

When Fr. Angelo returned to Italy after 18 years in St. Michael's Church and 54 years in the Vicariate of Arabia, Bishop Paul Hinder O.F.M. Cap appointed Fr. Ani Xavier as parish priest on 6 July 2007, with co-pastors Fr. Rodson, Fr. Antonio, Fr. Biju and Fr. Felicio. 35 prayer groups gather weekly,  and Masses are conducted in 8 languages.

References

External links
 St. Michael's, Sharjah: website

Buildings and structures in Sharjah (city)
Roman Catholic churches in the United Arab Emirates
Catholic Church in the Arabian Peninsula
Apostolic Vicariate of Southern Arabia